Eupithecia latimedia is a moth in the  family Geometridae. It is found in India (Dalhousie) and Nepal.

References

Moths described in 1895
latimedia
Moths of Asia